Lara (née Lara Lor-Van) is a fictional character appearing in American comic books published by DC Comics. She first appeared in the Superman comic strip and was created by Jerry Siegel and Joe Shuster. Lara is the biological mother of Superman, and the wife of scientist Jor-El. Lara Lor-Van is Lara's full maiden name, as "Lor-Van" is the name of Lara's father. Most depictions of Kryptonian culture show that Kryptonian women use their father's full name as their last names before marriage. After marriage, they usually are known simply by their first names, though various versions show they use their husband's full name or last name as their married last name.

Lara's role in the Superman mythos has varied over the years, with her treatment and emphasis often depending on the decade in which she was written. Golden Age and early Silver Age stories treated Lara in a lesser role compared to her husband. However, stories from the 1970s onwards depict Lara in more prominent roles; one such example is the 2004 miniseries Superman: Birthright. After constructing his Fortress of Solitude, Superman honored his deceased biological parents with a statue of Jor-El and Lara holding up a globe of Krypton.

Susannah York portrays Lara in the 1978 film Superman: The Movie, the 1980 film Superman II, and the 1987 film Superman IV: The Quest for Peace. Ayelet Zurer portrayed Lara in the 2013 film Man of Steel, which is set in the DC Extended Universe. Mariana Klaveno portrayed the character in the second season of the television series Superman & Lois.

Golden and Silver Age versions 

Lara first appeared in the Superman newspaper comic strip in 1939, where she was first named "Lora." Her first comic book appearance (after being mentioned in the 1942 text novel The Adventures of Superman by George Lowther, where she was named "Lara" for the first time) was in More Fun Comics #101 in January–February 1945. A 1948 retelling of Superman's origin story subsequently delved into detail about Lara, though her more familiar Silver Age aspects became more firmly established starting in the late 1950s and over the course of the next several decades.

After the establishment of DC's multiverse in the early 1960s, the Golden Age version of Superman's mother was stated as having been named "Lora", and lived on the Krypton of the Earth-Two universe. The Silver Age Lara, meanwhile, lived on the Krypton of the Earth-One universe.

A definitive synopsis of the Silver Age Lara's life (summarizing the various stories revealing her history) came in the 1979 miniseries The World of Krypton (not to be confused with the post-Crisis on Infinite Earths late 1980s comic special of the same name).

As summarized in The World of Krypton (and in various other stories), Lara was a promising astronaut in Krypton's space program. However, Krypton's space program was soon permanently grounded after Jax-Ur blew up one of Krypton's inhabited moons. Eventually, Lara met scientist Jor-El, with the two having several adventures together before getting married, such as a time-traveling Lois Lane attempting to seduce Jor-El after failing to marry their son in the future. Some time later, Lara gave birth to the couple's only child, Kal-El.

Early in Jor-El and Lara's marriage, the couple are briefly watched by the Guardians of the Universe, who note that Lara (or her husband) would have made an excellent Green Lantern.

Lara and her husband Jor-El were shown to be practitioners of the Kryptonian martial art of "klurkor".

When Krypton was about to explode, Lara and Jor-El placed their infant son into an escape rocket built by Jor-El. In most retellings, Jor-El wanted Lara to accompany their son to Earth, but Lara refused, saying their son would have a better chance of reaching Earth without her extra weight. Kal-El's spaceship then took off, leaving Lara and Jor-El to perish.

Modern Age versions 
After the 1985-1986 miniseries Crisis on Infinite Earths and John Byrne's 1986 miniseries The Man of Steel rewrote Superman's origins, details about Lara's background and character were changed. Under Byrne's version, Lara inhabited a cold, emotionally sterile Krypton where even bodily contact was forbidden. Lara's grandmother, Lady Nara, and Seyg-El, Jor-El's father, were the ones who arranged the union between them – so that they might have a child who would fill an opening in the planet's Register of Citizens when another Kryptonian died a rare and untimely death. Jor-El, however, was considered a "throwback" for actually expressing emotions toward his wife Lara, and for his favoring the less sterilized days of past Kryptonian eras. In this version of the mythos, Lara was a librarian and historian of high rank and thought it horrifying that Kal-El would be sent to a "primitive" planet such as Earth. In one story, the adult Kal (now Superman) is transported to the past and encounters his parents moments before Krypton's destruction. Lara is disgusted by what she sees and tells Kal not to approach her, finding him "repellent", even as she is ashamed of her feelings.

In the 2004 Superman miniseries Superman: Birthright, Lara, along with Krypton and Jor-El, more or less again became their Silver Age versions, though with updated touches. In this version, Lara is treated as a fully equal partner to Jor-El in constructing Kal-El's spacecraft and in designing various key components.

In the 2009 series Superman: Secret Origin by Geoff Johns, Superman is first introduced to his birth mother in his teens by the spaceship that brought him to the Earth as a baby. She is introduced to Kal-El by a hologram of Jor-El as his mother. This moment shocks Superman and brings tears to Martha Kent's eyes.

Also in 2009, Lara's own family background is described. Lara Lor-Van is born into the Labor Guild, whose members are not physically abused but have no say in the choices of their lives and who, unlike the members of other guilds, cannot change guilds. Lara became a member of her husband's Science Guild when she married him and was thereby granted all the freedoms granted to other Science Guild members. A member of Krypton's Military Guild describes this as being "raised up."

The New 52 
In September 2011, The New 52 rebooted DC's continuity. In this new timeline, Lara is a member of Krypton's military forces. One of the most talented students on the Military Academy, Lara is both a skilled fighter and a bright scientist.

Lara appears in the "Krypton Returns" storyline. She gives her maiden name as "Lara Van-El."

Other versions
In Art Baltazar's Superman Family Adventures, Lara survived Krypton's destruction by escaping into the Phantom Zone. She is eventually freed by her son and accepted into the Superman family. Though Jor-El didn't make it out, Superman uses a specific crystal that allows him to resurrect Jor-El for 24 hours that would allow the two to spend more time with each other. When the family tries to stop Brainiac, the villain stops his assault and moves Kandor when he discovers that Lara is pregnant, telling the group that their family isn't complete yet. Lara gives birth in Baltazar's Super Powers book, where her time in the Phantom Zone has altered the baby's DNA to look like Brainiac.
In the Elseworlds series Superman: The Last Family of Krypton, Jor-El was able to save himself and Lara and accompany Kal-El to Earth, where Jor-El sets up the corporation JorCorp while Lara establishes the self-help movement 'Raology'. More open to adapting on Earth, she arranges for Kal-El to be discreetly adopted by the Kents so that he can live a more normal life, and later has twin children, Bru-El and Valora, whose 'stunted' genetics due to their birth on Earth mean that they only possess half of the superhuman potential of their brother. While attending a dinner in Gotham, Lara is able to save Thomas and Martha Wayne when she intercepts Joe Chill's attempted mugging, thus unknowingly preventing the creation of Batman, Jor-El's own actions further hindering the opportunity for mankind to develop its own heroes in the belief that his family are enough. Lara eventually rejects Jor-El's desire to 'micromanage' humanity out of fear of Earth being destroyed as Krypton was, relocating to her own estate of 'Lara-Land', where she uses red sun emitters to restrict her natural abilities and simply encourages spiritual growth while using Kryptonian technology to heal injuries. However, the manipulation of Lex Luthor allows him to turn her son, Bru-El, into a kryptonite-powered superhuman who nearly kills Jor-El before Lara takes the blast herself, this attack also infecting her with a secret virus that kills her after a few days of exposure.
 In Superman Adventures (based on the animated series), the story arc "Family Reunion" sees Superman accidentally travel to a parallel universe where a single Kryptonian city survived Krypton's destruction, with its natives including Jor-El and Lara. However, after spending years drifting in space, Lara has become bitter and egotistical, abducting the 'local' Superman and Supergirl and brainwashing them into being dedicated Kryptonian soldiers to the point that they are willing to conquer Earth and enslave humanity to ensure Krypton's survival, even killing the Kents to ensure that her programming is successful. When the 'prime' Superman arrives in this world, he joins forces with Jor-El and some of his enemies to force the Kryptonian forces back to the city, at which point Jor-El reveals that he intends to destroy the city so that the resulting explosion will send Superman home. When Lara asks if he is really willing to destroy the remaining few hundred Kryptonians to save all of Earth, Jor-El grimly observes that she has just answered her own question and triggers the self-destruct.

In other media

Radio
Lara appears in The Adventures of Superman, portrayed by Agnes Moorehead.

Television
 Lara appears in the Adventures of Superman premiere episode "Superman on Earth", portrayed by Aline Towne.
 Lara appears in a flashback in the Super Friends episode "The Planet Splitter".
 Lara appears in the Challenge of the Super Friends episode "Secret Origins of the Super Friends".
 Lara makes a non-speaking appearance in a flashback in the Lois & Clark: The New Adventures of Superman episode "Foundling",  portrayed by Eliza Roberts.

 Lara appears in the Superman: The Animated Series premiere episode "The Last Son of Krypton",  voiced by Finola Hughes in "The Last Son of Krypton". This version is depicted with elements of her Silver Age and Modern Age selves, being headstrong and an equal partner to Jor-El.
 Lara makes a cameo appearance in the Pinky and the Brain episode.
 Lara makes a cameo appearance in the Justice League episode "Twilight".
 Lara has appeared in one episode of Season 3 in Smallville, played by Kendall Cross. Clark was dipped in a tank of kryptonite enhanced liquid used to induce repressed memories to come to surface. His mother placed baby Kal-El into the rocket which will take him to Earth. While Jor-El was more concerned about his son fulfilling his destiny, Lara was worried no one would love him. Clark came out of his fugue screaming her name, leaving him with the reassurance that his mother had loved him (as opposed to Jor-El's apparently heartless manipulation of him, although his intentions were later confirmed to be benevolent), Martha Kent subsequently telling him "Lara" was his first word, but she and Jonathan never knew what it meant. In the episode named "Lara" of season 7, it is revealed that Lara, now played by Helen Slater, visited the Kent farm prior to the destruction of Krypton. Along with Kara, they hide a photograph of Lara so that Kal-El will find it. It is also noted in this episode that Lara's DNA was hidden in the blue crystal by her brother-in-law Zor-El. Pictures of Lara from this episode can be found here. In the episode "Blue" Lara and Zor-El are released onto Earth in corporeal form (although technically not alive). The story culminates in Clark's destruction of the crystal to rid the world of Zor-El. Although upset to again lose his mother, with her assurance that she loves him, he is able to in order to save Kara's life. The naming conventions in Smallville seem to differ from the comic book continuity. Kara refers to Lara as Lara-El at the start of the episode of "Blue." This means that females, on Smallville, take their husband's last name and attach to their first. In the 10th-season episode "Abandoned!", she appears alongside Julian Sands as Jor-El, appearing in the form of a holographic message that Jor-El and Lara had recorded for Kal-El shortly before his ship was launched. After Lois travels to the Fortress to confront Jor-El about his failures as a father, the message featuring Jor-El and Lara assures their son that they have faith in him.
 Lara debuts in the pilot episode of Supergirl, portrayed by Ana Franchesca Rousseau. She and Jor-El are seen in flashback as scientists who sent Kal-El to Earth before Krypton's destruction. An ice sculpture of her appears in Fortress of Solitude throughout the series.
 Lara is featured in Superman & Lois, portrayed by Mariana Klaveno. While having fathered Kal-El with Jor-El, this version previously fathered Tal-Rho with a Kryptonian named Zeta-Rho. Tal-Rho landed on Earth and began implanting Kryptonian consciousnesses into humans with her creation called the Eradicator. In the episode "O Mother, Where Art Thou?", Clark and Lois use the Eradicator to insert Lara's consciousness into Lana Lang to gather information on how to undo the process. After she reverses the Eradicator, Superman powers it with a solar flare, removing all Kryptonian consciousnesses, including Lara, from their hosts. She later appeared in the episode "The Ties That Bind" as an A.I. hologram. Tal-Rho had a crystal containing her A.I. in his lair. While she is pleased to see her sons together and meet her grandson Jordan, Lara claims that there might be some good on Tal-Rho due to what Zeta-Rho's hologram led him to do. She was able to scan Superman to find the source of his painful visions as she scans him. Following a brief fight with Tal-Rho, Superman learned from Lara's A.I. that his painful visions are coming from an "invasive cosmological event". She later scans Bizarro even when Superman and Tal-Rho had escaped from DEO custody. She does persuade Tal-Rho to help Superman fight Mitch Anderson.
 The Bizarro version of Lara's A.I. hologram appears in the episode "Bizarros in a Bizarro World". Superman encounters her at Bizarro World's Fortress of Solitude where she learns about Bizarro's death and she tells him what she knows about Bizarro Ally Allston. Lara's A.I. is turned off upon the arrival of Jonathan Kent's counterpart Jon-El.
An ice statue of Lara appears in the Fortress of Solitude in the fourth season of Young Justice, titled Phantoms.

Films
 Lara appears in the Superman serial premiere episode "Superman Comes to Earth", portrayed by Luana Walters. Portions of this depiction appear in flashback as Lex Luthor recounts the story of Krypton's destruction in "At the Mercy of Atom Man!", the seventh chapter of the 1950 serial Atom Man vs. Superman.
 Lara was played by Susannah York in Superman (1978), Superman II (1980) and Superman IV: The Quest for Peace (1987) (voice only). After Jor-El (Marlon Brando) was removed from Superman II, Lara took on the role as Superman's mentor, in both Superman II and IV. She was later replaced by Brando's Jor-El in Superman II: The Richard Donner Cut, the 2006 edit of Superman II.
 Lara appears in a flashback in the 2011 direct-to-video animated film All-Star Superman. Also, a large statue of her and Jor-El appear in the Fortress of Solitude in the present.
 Lara appears in the 2013 film Man of Steel, portrayed by Ayelet Zurer. Julia Ormond had previously been announced as cast, but dropped out. Connie Nielsen was in negotiations for the role before Ormond was cast. In this version, she is hesitant about sending Superman away to a primitive world, fearing they will kill him. Even after her husband assures her that is impossible, she worries that the craft won't make it. When Zod confronts Jor-El about stealing the codex and learns of the Els' natural-born son (which is against Kryptonian law as all children are genetically engineered to be more efficient), he fights Jor-El while Lara punches in the launch coordinates to her son's ship and sends him to earth despite Zod's pending to Save Krypton she decides to save her son's life. She runs to her husband's side after he is killed by Zod. She attends the sentencing of Zod and his rebels into the Phantom Zone where she gives Zod a stoic and cold look even after he cryptically warns her that he will find her son. After placing her husband's corpse into a burial chamber, she watches as Krypton is destroyed. Before she dies with the rest of her people, her last words to her son were "Make a better world than ours Kal."
 An alternate universe version of Lara appears in Justice League: Gods and Monsters, voiced by Lauren Tom.
 Lara appears in Batman and Superman: Battle of the Super Sons, voiced by Myrna Velasco.
 Lara appears in DC League of Super-Pets, voiced by Lena Headey.

Video games
 The Man of Steel version of Lara appears as a playable character in Lego Batman 3: Beyond Gotham.
 Lara makes an appearance in the opening for the story mode from Injustice 2.

Parodies
 Lara appeared in the Robot Chicken episode "Especially the Animal Keith Crofford", voiced by Vanessa Hudgens.
 Lara and Jor-El make a cameo appearance in Dilbert episode "Pregnancy" (in which Dilbert is accidentally impregnated by his own rocket). To save his child from the masses who wish to use it for their own gain, Dilbert puts the child on a rocket ship and sends him into space with Dogbert programming the ship to go to Krypton (which did not explode as Jor-El had predicted), specifically to the El family home.

Notes

References
Tranberg, Charles (2005). I Love the Illusion: The Life And Career of Agnes Moorehead. Albany, Georgia, BearManor Media. .

External links
 Lara Lor-Van information at IMDB.com
 Lara Lor-Van's entry at the DC Comics Database
 DC Comics official website

Comics characters introduced in 1939
DC Comics female superheroes
DC Comics extraterrestrial superheroes
Fictional artists
Fictional astronauts
Fictional librarians
DC Comics scientists
DC Comics film characters
Kryptonians
Characters created by Jerry Siegel
Characters created by Joe Shuster
Superman characters